Lieutenant-general Dan Ghica-Radu (born September 13, 1955 in Topoloveni, Argeș County) was the chief of the Romanian Land Forces Staff from 17 March 2009 to 16 January 2011.

Education
"Dimitrie Cantemir" Military Highschool, Breaza – 1974
Nicolae Bălcescu Land Forces Academy, Sibiu – 1977
Academy of High Military Studies, Faculty of tanks – 1987
National Defense College – 2002
NATO Defense College, Rome – 2005

Commands
1998-2000: 1st Division's Intelligence office chief
2000-03: Chief of Operations office of Land Forces staff
2003-04: Commander of 282nd Mechanized Brigade
2004-06: Director of Land Forces staff
2006-07: Deputy Chief of Operations within Multinational force in Iraq general staff
2008-09: Commander of Marshal Alexandru Averescu Joint Operational Command

Personal life
Dan Ghica-Radu is married and has three children.

External links
  General Ghica-Radu's biography on the Romanian Land Forces website

|-

1955 births
Living people
People from Topoloveni
Romanian Land Forces generals